Pyrocoelia is a genus of beetles belonging to the family Lampyridae.

The species of this genus are found in Southeastern Asia.

Species

Species:

Pyrocoelia abdominalis 
Pyrocoelia amplissima 
Pyrocoelia analis

References

Lampyridae
Lampyridae genera